Cascade Mountain may refer to:

 Cascade Mountain (Alberta) a mountain in Alberta, Canada
 Cascade Mountain (New York) a mountain in New York, United States
 Cascade Mountain (ski area), a ski area in Wisconsin, United States
 Cascade Mountain (Utah), a mountain in Utah, United States. Part of the Wasatch Range.

See also
 Cascade Mountains, a mountain range that runs north–south along the west coast of Canada and the United States